Jerry Grcevich (born 1951) is a Croatian American folk musician, tamburitza virtuoso and composer. He is a frontman of the Penn Sembles.

Grcevic was born in Turtle Creek in Pittsburgh, in the family of Croatian emigrants from Ozalj, Karlovac and Podravina. He was introduced to tamburica by his father and uncle, both tamburica players (at Sloboda Tamburitza Orchestra), and started playing in his father's orchestra as a ten-year-old. At the age of 21, he traveled to Croatia and Vojvodina, where he was studying with Janika Balaž in Novi Sad. He also met Zvonko Bogdan, with whom he toured in the US and Canada. Since 1980 he composes and records his own music. As a player of more tamburica instruments (bisernica, brač, bugarija, berda i čelo), he usually played and recorded whole albums on its own. During 1980s, Grcevich took multiple ethnomusicological researches throuought Croatia.

At the end of the 1980s he started collaboration with Miroslav Škoro, for whom he arranged and recorded his first album Ne dirajte mi ravnicu. He is co-author and arranger of Škoro's hits Moja Juliška nad Ne dirajte mi ravnicu. Since 1993, Grcevich has had his own group, The Jerry Grcevich Tamburitza Orchestra, which has performed extensively throughout the United States and Canada.

In 2005 he was awarded by National Endowment for the Arts National Heritage Fellowship for his musical work, especially for performances and cultural cooperation with Irish, Romanian and Hungarian Americans in Pittsburgh. He also became the first Western Pennsylvania artist to receive the award.

Discography 
 New Traditions (1992), Novi Odlazak Productions
 Croatian Dances Vol.III (1997), self-released
 Mila Moja (2008), self-released
 Sonya i Jerry, Kao Nekad (2011), self-released
 Tamburitza Dance Tonight (2013), self-released

References

External links 
Jerry Grcevich Discogs

1951 births
Living people
American people of Croatian descent
Musicians from Pittsburgh